Peter Dalgado (26 April 1930 – 22 November 1986) was a Kenyan field hockey player. He competed in the men's tournament at the 1956 Summer Olympics.

References

External links
 

1930 births
1986 deaths
Kenyan male field hockey players
Olympic field hockey players of Kenya
Field hockey players at the 1956 Summer Olympics
Sportspeople from Yangon
Indian emigrants to Kenya
Kenyan people of Indian descent
Kenyan people of Goan descent
Kenyan emigrants to Canada
Canadian sportspeople of Indian descent
Canadian people of Goan descent